is a 1988 arcade video game developed and published by Data East that was later ported to the Nintendo Entertainment System. It is a horizontally scrolling shooter in which the player flies a heavily armoured helicopter through six stages to destroy enemy tanks, cannons, submarines, and gunboats. There are missions to Sumatra, Java, Borneo, South China Sea, Siam, and the enemy's headquarters.

Ports

The NES port of Cobra Command was released the same year as the arcade game. Unlike the arcade game, the NES version does not scroll automatically, and its gameplay is similar to Choplifter as the main goal for each level is to rescue all of the hostages. Also, throughout the game, the player's helicopter can be upgraded by landing in certain areas.

A port of Cobra Command was announced to be released on the Retro-Bit Super Retro Cade.

Reception 
In Japan, Game Machine listed the game on their October 15, 1988 issue as being the sixth most-successful table arcade unit of the month.

References

External links

Cobra Command at Arcade History

1988 video games
Arcade video games
Helicopter video games
Horizontally scrolling shooters
Data East video games
Multiplayer and single-player video games
Video games set in Indonesia
Video games set in Thailand
Java in fiction
Nintendo Entertainment System games
Video games developed in Japan